Nargis Javany (born 1997 in Kyiv, Ukraine) is a British Afghan London based model. She is of Pashtoon, and Russian origin, and she is the first Afghan/Russian model to be featured in Miss England quarter finals. She also won miss Asia London in 2012

Biography
Nargis started her career in 2008; Modelling for singer Valy Hedjasi and then went on to model for many companies such as Asiana magazine and Asian bride magazine pakistan fashion week, London fashion week she was also featured in newspaper for Richmond, London.

References

1994 births
Living people
British female models